The Tour 2012 "Algorhytmique" was the fifth national tour by Japanese band Nico Touches the Walls. Started on September 27, 2012 and ended on December 20, being the band's longest tour of career.

Set list

Tour dates

References

External links 
 Official website 
 A-Sketch's website for Nico Touches the Walls 

Concert tours of Japan